The Grammy Award for Best Country Collaboration with Vocals was an honor presented at the Grammy Awards, a ceremony that was established in 1958 and originally called the Gramophone Awards, to quality country music collaborations for artists who do not normally perform together. Honors in several categories are presented at the ceremony annually by the National Academy of Recording Arts and Sciences of the United States to "honor artistic achievement, technical proficiency and overall excellence in the recording industry, without regard to album sales or chart position".

Originally called the Best Country Vocal Performance, Duet, the award was first presented to Kenny Rogers and Ronnie Milsap at the 30th Grammy Awards in 1988 for the single "Make No Mistake, She's Mine". The next year, the category's name was changed to Best Country Vocal Collaboration, a name it held until 1996 when it was awarded as the Best Country Collaboration with Vocals. In 2011, the category was merged with the Grammy Award for Best Country Performance by a Duo or Group with Vocal and the Grammy Award for Best Country Instrumental Performance, forming the Grammy Award for Best Country Duo/Group Performance in order to "tighten the number of categories" at the Grammy Awards.

Alison Krauss holds the record for having the most wins in this category, with a total of five. She is followed by seven others, who have all won the award twice. Among the most nominated are Emmylou Harris and Willie Nelson, both nine-time nominees. Krauss was nominated eight times, while Dolly Parton was a seven-time hopeful. Nominated bands include 1996 winners Shenandoah, a five-man country music band, three-time nominees the Nitty Gritty Dirt Band, as well as one of the award's final recipients, the Zac Brown Band.

Recipients

 Each year is linked to the article about the Grammy Awards held that year.

See also

 Grammy Award for Best Country Duo/Group Performance
 Grammy Award for Best Country Performance by a Duo or Group with Vocal
 Grammy Award for Best Country Solo Performance
 Grammy Award for Best Female Country Vocal Performance
 Grammy Award for Best Male Country Vocal Performance

References

General
  Note: User must select the "Country" category as the genre under the search feature.

Specific

External links
Official site of the Grammy Awards

Awards disestablished in 2011
Awards established in 1988
Collaborative projects
Grammy Awards for country music
Musical collaboration awards